The Louth Senior Football Championship is an annual Gaelic Athletic Association competition organised by Louth GAA among the top Gaelic football clubs in County Louth, Ireland. The winning club qualifies to represent the county in the Leinster Senior Club Football Championship, the winner of which progresses to the All-Ireland Senior Club Football Championship.

Trophy
The winning team is presented with the Joe Ward Cup, in memory of the former county Board Chairman. The Stabannon Parnells club were the first recipients in 1949.

Top winners

Finals

 Title awarded to Boyne Rangers as Eamonn Ceannt's were unable to field a team for the second replay.

Title awarded to Dundalk Gaels after objection. St Mary's fielded an ineligible player

Title awarded to Young Irelands after objection. Tredaghs fielded an ineligible player

See also

References

External links
 Louth GAA official website
 Louth on Hoganstand
 Louth Club GAA
 Louth GAA Blog
 Louth GAA Blog Shop

 
Louth GAA club championships
Senior Gaelic football county championships